Note: This ship should not be confused with the first USS Lydia (SP-62), which was in commission during an overlapping period.

The second USS Lydia (ID-3524) was a United States Navy cargo ship in commission from 1918 to 1919.
 
Lydia was built as a commercial freighter in 1902 by Wigham Richardson and Company at Newcastle upon Tyne, England, in the United Kingdom. Prior to World War I, the Royal Hungarian Sea Navigation Company of Austria-Hungary operated her as SS Szell Kalman.

On 1 Jun 1917 she was seized by Brazilian authorities while laid up at Pernambuco.

By 1918 she had come under the control of the United States Shipping Board, from which the U.S. Navy acquired her on 23 October 1918 for use in World War I.  The Navy assigned her Identification Number (Id. No.) 3524 and commissioned her as USS Lydia on 26 October 1918 at Baltimore, Maryland.

Assigned to the Naval Overseas Transportation Service, Lydia departed Baltimore on 7 November 1918—four days before the war ended with the Armistice with Germany of 11 November 1918—bound for Norfolk, Virginia, where she joined a convoy bound for Europe on 15 November 1918. Loaded with aviation steel and general supplies, she arrived at Nantes, France, during the first week in December 1918. She departed Nantes on 14 December 1918 for Baltimore, where she arrived on 4 January 1919. There she loaded a cargo of food for the United States Food Administration, and departed for the Mediterranean on 7 February 1919. She arrived at Constantinople in the Ottoman Empire on 16 March 1919, exchanged her cargo for water ballast, and departed on 30 March 1919 for the United States. Steaming via Gibraltar, she arrived at Norfolk on 9 May 1919.

The Navy decommissioned Lydia on 15 May 1919 and returned her to the United States Shipping Board the same day. She became SS Lydia.

In 1925, the Shipping Board sold Lydia to Adria Società Anonima di Navigazione Marittima of Fiume, Italy. Renamed SS Manzoni, she operated out of Fiume until after World War II.

References
 
 NavSource Online: Section Patrol Craft Photo Archive Lydia (ID 3524)

Specific

Lydia
Ships built on the River Tyne
1902 ships
Lydia